Killegray is an island in the Sound of Harris in the Outer Hebrides of Scotland.

Geography

The south end of the island is nearly all deep uncultivated moss. There is better cultivated land at the north.

History
Rubha Claidhe in the north is the site of a ruined chapel, Teampull na h-Annait, which may be the origin of the island's name.

Currently uninhabited, the island was occupied by a family of around three to five people from 1861 to 1931. Two people were temporarily living on the island when the 1971 census was taken.

The 19th-century Killegray House, the only house on the island was renovated as holiday accommodation in 1991.

Wildlife
The shallow waters and reefs are a rich breeding ground for velvet crabs and lobsters.

Possible development
Jacobs Babtie has investigated building a combination of bridges and causeways across the Sound of Harris. Wind turbines and tidal generators could be incorporated in the scheme from Berneray via Killegray and Ensay to Harris. The estimated cost of £75 million could rise to £145 million with the renewable energy devices.

Notes and references

Islands of the Sound of Harris
Uninhabited islands of the Outer Hebrides